Kharkiv State University of Food Technology and Trade is a Ukrainian university in Kharkiv.

Post address: 333 Klochkivska, 61051 Kharkiv, Ukraine

Campuses and buildings 
The University is located in 5 academic buildings that make up the unique ensemble of buildings; the total area is 41 323 m2.

Institutes and faculties 
 Educational and Research Institute of Food Technologies and Business
 The Faculty of Equipment and Technical Service
 Merchandising Faculty
 Faculty of Management
 Economic Faculty
 Accounting and Finance Faculty

External links
Official website

Universities in Ukraine